Cloverdale is an unincorporated community in Chautauqua County, Kansas, United States.

History
A post office was established in Cloverdale in 1871, and remained in operation until it was discontinued in 1905.

References

Further reading

External links
 Chautauqua County maps: Current, Historic, KDOT

Unincorporated communities in Chautauqua County, Kansas
Unincorporated communities in Kansas